Feels Just Like It Should may refer to:
"Feels Just Like It Should" (Jamiroquai song)
"Feels Just Like It Should" (Pat Green song)